The Conservative Political Action Conference (CPAC) is an annual political conference attended by conservative activists and elected officials from across the United States and beyond. CPAC is hosted by the American Conservative Union (ACU). The first CPAC took place in 1974.

The same name and acronym has been used for conferences in other countries.

History

1974
The conference was founded in 1974 by the American Conservative Union and Young Americans for Freedom as a small gathering of dedicated conservatives. Ronald Reagan gave the inaugural keynote speech at CPAC in 1974. The presidential hopeful used it to share his vision for the country—"A Shining City Upon A Hill," words borrowed from John Winthrop.

2010–2017
The 2010 CPAC featured co-sponsorship for the first time from GOProud, a gay conservative group. GoProud is credited in the media for initiating talks with ACU to invite Donald Trump to speak at CPAC 2011. The 2011 CPAC speech Trump gave, is credited for helping kick-start his political career within the Republican Party. Christopher R. Barron, co-founder of GOProud who would later not only endorse Trump's 2016 presidential campaign, but also launch LGBT for Trump, said he "would love to see Mr. Trump run for president".

In 2014, CPAC extended an invitation to American Atheists, which was immediately withdrawn on the same day due to controversial statements by AA's president David Silverman, who declared his group was going to "enlighten conservatives" and that "the Christian right should be threatened by us". The 2015 CPAC featured Jamila Bey who became the first atheist activist to address CPAC's annual meeting. 

The 2016 CPAC featured co-sponsorship for the first time from the Log Cabin Republicans. In December 2016, CPAC extended an invitation to conservative blogger Milo Yiannopoulos to speak at the event, despite his history of controversial views on feminism, racial minorities, and transgender issues. The invitation was canceled when the Reagan Battalion re-posted a video of 2016 and 2015 YouTube videos in which Yiannopoulos is heard making comments defending sexual relationships between adult men and 13-year-old boys, citing his own sexual experiences at that age with a Catholic priest.

Richard Spencer, a figurehead of the alt-right and a white supremacist, entered the lobby of the Gaylord National Hotel on February 23, 2017 in an attempt to access CPAC. Organizers of the conference ejected him from the hotel as soon as his presence was discovered, citing his "repugnant [views which] ... have absolutely nothing to do with conservatism or what we do here" as cause for rejecting his admission to CPAC. ACU's Executive Director Dan Schneider castigated Spencer and the alt-right in a main-stage speech, calling them "garden-variety, left-wing fascists," and saying that the alt-right "despises everything [conservatives] believe in". Media members across the political spectrum condemned the intrusion as yet another attempt by groups like the alt-right to conceal their extremist views within a legitimate philosophy. Opinion columns in The New York Times, and articles in Mother Jones and Rolling Stone voiced concern about the 2017 interview of ex-Trump Adviser Steve Bannon and ex-Trump Chief of Staff Reince Priebus with ACU Chairman Matt Schlapp, advocating for the American Right to reject the tenets of the alt-right (e.g. homophobia, xenophobia, sexism, racism, etc.).

2019 

The 2019 Conservative Political Action Conference was held at the Gaylord National Resort & Convention Center in Oxon Hill, Maryland, from February 27 to March 2, 2019. The event was headlined by President Trump, with many additional speakers. Themes throughout the conference were fighting against socialism; criminal justice reform; China; and criticizing Alexandria Ocasio-Cortez and the Green New Deal.

2020–2021

In 2020, CPAC hosted its main event in the beginning of the COVID-19 pandemic despite the public health risks. On Saturday, March 7, 2020, ACU confirmed that an attendee at the 2020 CPAC later tested positive for COVID-19. Senator Ted Cruz, Representatives Matt Gaetz, Paul Gosar, Doug Collins, and Mark Meadows had direct contact with the unnamed carrier, and announced their self-quarantine.

The following year, the 2021 Conservative Political Action Conference was held during the COVID-19 pandemic. The previous customary venue for CPAC, (Gaylord National Resort & Convention Center) in National Harbor, Maryland was subject to public health restrictions in Maryland, issued by Republican governor Larry Hogan, which restricted gathering sizes to a maximum of 10, to curb the spread of the disease.

As a result, the conference was relocated to Orlando, Florida, which had removed all prior pandemic-related limits on gathering sizes. The event was still subject to Orlando mandatory mask-wearing rules.  Notwithstanding those restrictions, numerous attendees chose to not wear masks during the event, despite frequent announcements by the event's organizers and hotel staff, requesting attendees to comply with the local mask-wearing mandate. Florida Governor Ron DeSantis characterized the state's resistance to pandemic gathering-size limits as comporting with the state's status as "an oasis of freedom." The conference's theme, "America Uncancelled", sought to highlight alleged attempts by social media companies, the Democratic Party, U.S. universities and progressive organizations to censor conservatives' public expression of their political views. The conference's main event was a closing address by former U.S. president Donald Trump, his first public address and political speech since leaving office. Trump spent significant portions of the speech criticizing his successor, Joe Biden. The speech received significant media coverage in anticipation of Trump's announcement of his post-presidential political activity.

A second 2021 conference was held in Dallas from July 9 to 11 at the Hilton Anatole hotel. The theme of the conference was immigration policy and border security, in the context of the ongoing migrant crisis at the U.S. Southern Border.

2022

The 2022 conference was held on February 24 to 27 in Orlando, Florida. Speakers included Trump, Florida governor Ron DeSantis, and former Democratic congresswoman and presidential candidate Tulsi Gabbard.

As in 2021, a second conference was held in Dallas, Texas from August 4 to 6. Speakers included Trump, Arizona Republican Gubernatorial candidate Kari Lake, and many congressional representatives.

As part of one of the 2022 break-out sessions, the CPAC displayed a banner across their main stage with the phrase "We are all domestic terrorists."

2023 
CPAC returned to National Harbor, Maryland for their 2023 conference. Major speakers at the winter event included Donald J. Trump, Steve Bannon, US House members Marjorie Taylor Greene, Matt Gaetz and Lauren Boebert, presidential candidate Nikki Haley, and Donald Trump Jr. Attendance was thinner than at previous conferences, with the main ballroom often half-full during speeches, though Trump drew a capacity crowd. He said he would not withdraw from the 2024 presidential race if he was indicted as a result of federal and state investigations underway. CNN fact checker Daniel Dale found that Trump "made some of his most thoroughly dishonest speeches" at the conference. Trump said, in part:

In 2016, I declared: I am your voice. Today, I add: I am your warrior. I am your justice. And for those who have been wronged and betrayed: I am your retribution.

Also during the conference political commentator Michael Knowles called for the elimination of "transgenderism," arguing that those who identify as transgender are "laboring a delusion, and we need to correct that delusion." Knowles further stated that "there can be no middle way in dealing with transgenderism," and that "for the good of society, and especially for the good of the poor people who have fallen prey to this confusion, transgenderism must be eradicated from public life entirely." Knowles' comments were criticized by several political media figures, including civil rights attorney Alejandra Caraballo, describing them as genocidal. Knowles demanded that The Daily Beast retract a headline stating that he was calling for the eradication of the "transgender community".

Presidential candidate Vivek Ramaswamy later alleged that a political consultant with ties to CPAC had offered to rig the straw poll in his favor in exchange for $100,000+, which Ramaswamy declined.

Annual straw poll

The annual CPAC straw poll vote traditionally serves as a barometer for the feelings of the conservative movement. During the conference, attendees are encouraged to fill out a survey that asks questions on a variety of issues.  The questions regarding the most popular possible presidential candidates are the most widely reported. One component of CPAC is evaluating conservative candidates for president, and the straw poll serves generally to quantify conservative opinion.

Overall, former U.S. President Donald Trump holds the record of winning more CPAC straw polls than any other individual, with six (as of March 2023). Mitt Romney follows with four, and Ronald Reagan, Jack Kemp and Rand Paul follow with three wins each, followed by Ron Paul with two wins. Of these five, the Pauls are the only two to win more than one straw poll, yet never appear on a Republican presidential ticket in any election (although Ron Paul did receive one Electoral College vote in 2016). Despite his former popularity, Romney was not invited from CPAC in 2020 because of his vote to hear additional witnesses in the first impeachment trial of Donald Trump and was also not invited to the 2021 CPAC after having voted to convict Trump on one count in his second impeachment trial. CPAC's chairman had said he could not ensure Romney's "physical safety" at the 2020 CPAC conference.

Foreign CPACs

Australia
Australia's first CPAC was held in August 2019, with guest speakers including former prime minister Tony Abbott, Brexit campaign leader Nigel Farage, former Breitbart News editor-in-chief Raheem Kassam and NSW One Nation leader Mark Latham. Liberal Senator Amanda Stoker and Craig Kelly MP were at the event. There were calls for Kassam to be banned from coming into the country before the event.

The second conference was held in November 2020. Canadian alt-right YouTuber Lauren Southern was initially scheduled to appear, but her invitation was rescinded by the organizers.

The 2022 conference was held in Sydney on October 1. Attendees included Tony Abbott, Eric Abetz, Katherine Deves, Nigel Farage, Jacinta Price and Amanda Stoker.

Brazil
The first CPAC in Brazil took place on 11–12 October 2019, in the city of São Paulo, attended by leading American conservatives including ACU chairman Matt Schlapp and his wife Mercedes Schlapp, Utah senator Mike Lee, Fox News specialist Walid Phares, as well as Brazilian figures including President Jair Bolsonaro's son Eduardo Bolsonaro, the Minister of Foreign Affairs Ernesto Araújo, and the Prince Imperial of Brazil Bertrand Maria José de Orléans e Bragança and others.

The ACU Foundation announced that the event would take place annually in Brazil from 2019.

In September 2021, Jason Miller, a former senior adviser to Donald Trump, and other American right-wing media personalities in his traveling party, were detained and questioned for three hours at Brasília International Airport following participation in the 2021 CPAC Brazil Conference. The investigation was part of an inquiry by Brazilian Supreme Court Justice Alexandre de Moraes into misinformation allegedly perpetuated by the administration of President Jair Bolsonaro. Miller had praised Bolsonaro’s supporters as "proud patriots" and claimed they had been deplatformed and shadow banned by Brazilian authorities. Miller continued to advise Jair Bolsonaro after his October 2022 election defeat, meeting with the president's son, Eduardo Bolsonaro, in November 2022, as protests and election challenges continued.

Hungary
  
 
A conservative conference billed by the organizers as CPAC Hungary was held on May 19–20, 2022 in Budapest, Hungary. Speakers included Hungary's Prime Minister Viktor Orbán, Spain's Vox party leader Santiago Abascal, Eduardo Bolsonaro, right-wing US commentator Candace Owens, Ernst Roets the Deputy CEO of AfriForum, and former US White House chief of staff Mark Meadows, as well as far-right US conspiracy theorist Jack Posobiec and Hungarian journalist Zsolt Bayer. According to The Guardian, Bayer has previously "called Jews 'stinking excrement', referred to Roma as 'animals' and used racial epithets to describe Black people".

Japan
The first international CPAC was hosted in Tokyo on December 16–17, 2017 by the Japanese Conservative Union (JCU) in conjunction with the American Conservative Union (ACU). JCU and ACU have continued to co-host J-CPACs every year since. Participants have included notable lawmakers and conservatives from the U.S., Japan, and around the world. They include ACU chairman Matt Schlapp and executive director Dan Schneider, White House chief of staff Mick Mulvaney, U.S. Representatives Bruce Westerman, and Paul Gosar, Fmr. METI Minister Akira Amari, Fmr. Defense Minister Gen Nakatani, Fmr. Defense Minister Tomomi Inada, Fmr. Taiwanese Finance Minister and WTO ambassador , journalist Sara Carter, then-SEC commissioner Michael Piwowar, Asia expert and commentator Gordon G. Chang, to name just a few. Hong Kong localist activist Andy Chan Ho-tin attended Japanese CPAC 2019 by video after he was arrested in Hong Kong on his way to Tokyo to make a live appearance.

Mexico 
The first CPAC in Mexico (CPAC México) took place on November 18–19, 2022 at a Westin hotel in Santa Fe, Mexico City. Speakers included former Trump White House advisor Steve Bannon, American anti-abortion activist Abby Johnson, Eduardo Bolsonaro, Argentinian presidential candidate Javier Milei, former Chilean presidential candidate José Antonio Kast, and Juan Iván Peña Neder, the President of the Mexican Republicans. It was organized by Mexican anti-abortion activist Eduardo Verástegui. At the start of the conference, a group of anti-fascist protesters wearing Che Guevara shirts and waving red hammer and sickle flags showed up at the hotel; Matt Schlapp dubbed the protest "CPAC Derangement Syndrome".

South Korea
The first CPAC in South Korea (KCPAC) took place between 3 October 2019, in the city of Seoul. They include ACU chairman Matt Schlapp and executive director Dan Schneider, Fmr. acting United States Attorney General Matthew Whitaker, Fmr. Deputy National Security Advisor of the United States K. T. McFarland, Asia expert and commentator Gordon G. Chang, Fox News host Jeanine Pirro, Founder of the New Institute Andrew Crilly, Fox News Contributor Sara A. Carter, Professor of law at Handong International Law School Eric Enlow, Professor emeritus at Yonsei University Kim Dong-gil, Fmr. public security prosecutor Koh Young-ju, Co-Chairperson KCPAC Annie M. H. Chan, Fmr. Prime minister of South Korea Hwang Kyo-ahn, Liberty Korea Party members of the National Assembly Kim Jin-tae and Chun Hee-kyung and Min Kyung-wook, Director of the International Strategic Research Institute Kim Jung-min, Director of Korea Institute for Crisis Management Analysis Huh Nam-sung, Fmr. Director of Korea Institute for National Unification Kim Tae-woo, Founder and former Chief of Pennmike Chung Kyu-jae, Lawyer Chae Myung-sung, Leader of Dawn of Liberty Party Park Kyul, Leader of Truth Forum Kim Eun-koo.

References

External links

 
 Home page for the American Conservative Union, the organization that runs CPAC

1973 establishments in the United States
American awards
Annual events in the United States
Articles containing video clips
Conservative political advocacy groups in the United States
Political career of Donald Trump
Political conferences
Political conventions in the United States
United States presidential straw polls